Paweł Staszek (born 20 May 1976) is a former speedway rider from Poland.

Speedway career
He rode in the top tier of British Speedway riding for the Oxford Silver Machine during the 2005 Elite League speedway season. He reached the 1997 Individual Speedway Junior World Championship final.

References 

1976 births
Living people
Polish speedway riders
Oxford Cheetahs riders